Rozoy-Bellevalle is a commune in the Aisne department in Hauts-de-France in northern France. It is part of the canton of Essômes-sur-Marne and the arrondissement of Château-Thierry.

Population

Personalities
Balloonist Henry de La Vaulx lived at the castle there and is buried there.

See also
Communes of the Aisne department

References

Communes of Aisne
Aisne communes articles needing translation from French Wikipedia